Alfred Macartney Hemsley (22 July 1860 – 12 July 1937) was an English-born Australian politician.

He was born in Ealing to solicitor Alexander Hemsley and Catherine Blackett. He attended the University of Oxford, where he received a Bachelor of Arts in 1886. He qualified as a solicitor in 1886 and in 1888 migrated to Sydney. He was a partner in a number of law firms, and from 1927 to 1937 he was a member of the New South Wales Legislative Council, first for the Nationalist Party and then for the United Australia Party. He died in Sydney in 1937.

References

1860 births
1937 deaths
Nationalist Party of Australia members of the Parliament of New South Wales
United Australia Party members of the Parliament of New South Wales
Members of the New South Wales Legislative Council